WXLV-TV (channel 45) is a television station licensed to Winston-Salem, North Carolina, United States, serving as the ABC affiliate for the Piedmont Triad region. It is owned by Sinclair Broadcast Group alongside Greensboro-licensed MyNetworkTV affiliate WMYV (channel 48). Both stations share studios on Myer Lee Drive (along US 421) in Winston-Salem, while WXLV-TV's transmitter is located in Randleman (along I-73/US 220).

History

Independent station
The station first signed on the air on September 24, 1979 as WGNN-TV. It was the first independent station in the Piedmont Triad region, and broadcast its signal from a transmitter located west of Gap in Stokes County. The station was bought by the TVX Broadcast Group in 1980 and changed its call letters to WJTM-TV on October 20. Over the years, the station ran a general entertainment format consisting of cartoons, movies, sitcoms, and drama series. It changed its call letters to WNRW on June 8, 1984 in memory of an employee, General Sales Manager William N. Rismiller, who was murdered in a shooting at the station that year.

WNRW: Fox affiliate
WNRW became the market's Fox affiliate when the network launched on October 9, 1986. By the late 1980s, the station had dropped its longtime moniker of "TV 45" in favor of "Fox 45."

In 1985, TVX Broadcast Group had bought out independent station WLFL in Raleigh. TVX could not keep both stations (common ownership of stations with overlapping city-grade signals would not be allowed until 2000), and had to put one of them on the market.

TVX kept the larger WLFL, and sold WNRW to Act III Broadcasting, becoming the first station to be acquired by the company. Meanwhile, the other major independent in the market, WGGT (channel 48), filed for bankruptcy in the late 1980s and still had not emerged from it by 1991. At that time, Act III cut a deal with WGGT's owner, Guilford Broadcasters, to purchase WGGT's stronger programming and merge it onto WNRW's lineup. WGGT then began to simulcast WNRW's schedule, creating a strong combined signal with over 60% overlap. The two stations referenced this through its on-air slogan as the "Piedmont Superstation". The two stations took on a secondary affiliation with UPN when that network debuted on January 16, 1995.

WXLV-TV: ABC affiliate
The simulcast continued after Act III Broadcasting merged with Abry Broadcast Partners in 1995, through Sullivan Broadcasting. That September, when Fox acquired longtime ABC affiliate WGHP (channel 8; which the station originally acquired from New World Communications, along with WBRC), WNRW and WGGT swapped affiliations with WGHP and became the Triad's ABC affiliates while all Fox programming (including Fox Kids) went to WGHP. As such, WGHP became one of only two stations that were involved in the Fox-New World deal to carry the block (the other being KTVI in St. Louis, Missouri, which began carrying it in the fall of 1996); other stations in the same deal declined to carry the block, which either remained on the former Fox station or moved to another station. WNRW also changed its callsign to the current WXLV-TV on September 3, 1995.

In 1996, Sullivan decided to have Mission Broadcasting to purchase WGGT from Guilford Broadcasters. In 1997, WGGT discontinued the simulcast with WXLV, and the two stations entered into a local marketing agreement (LMA) with WXLV as the senior partner. As part of the LMA, the UPN affiliation moved exclusively to channel 48, which changed its calls to WUPN-TV. Since David D. Smith, out of ABRY owns stock in Mission, Sullivan effectively had a duopoly in the Triad, although the FCC would not permit actual duopolies until late 1999. Sullivan then bought out by Sinclair Broadcast Group in 1998. A similar situation existed in the Research Triangle region, where Sinclair owned WLFL and Glencairn nominally owned WRDC. Sinclair bought WUPN outright in 2000, creating the market's first legal duopoly.

In 2003, Sinclair started a local news department for WUPN and WXLV, but it only operated until mid-2005.

In 2004, WXLV, following the lead of other Sinclair stations, censored an episode of Nightline where anchor Ted Koppel read the name of the soldiers during the Iraq War. Around the same time, WXLV was one of the few ABC stations who preempted an uninterrupted broadcast of the 1998 movie Saving Private Ryan.

Sinclair was later involved in a retransmission dispute with Time Warner Cable, whose original agreement ended on December 31, 2010. An agreement was reached on February 2, 2011, with no disruption to carriage of WXLV and WMYV. The same deal resulted in the a news share agreement with News 14 Carolina, Time Warner Cable's local news channel.

On May 8, 2017, Sinclair entered into an agreement to acquire Tribune Media – which has owned WGHP since December 2013 – for $3.9 billion, plus the assumption of $2.7 billion in debt held by Tribune. While WMYV is not in conflict with existing FCC in-market ownership rules and could have been retained by Sinclair in any event, the group was precluded from acquiring WGHP directly while retaining ownership of WXLV, as both rank among the four highest-rated stations in the Piedmont Triad in total day viewership, and there are too few independently owned full-power stations in the area to permit legal duopolies in any event. On April 24, 2018, Sinclair announced that it would sell WXLV-TV and eight other stations – Sinclair-operated KOKH-TV in Oklahoma City, WRLH-TV in Richmond, KDSM-TV in Des Moines, and WOLF-TV (along with LMA partners WSWB and WQMY) in Scranton/Wilkes-Barre, and Tribune-owned WPMT in Harrisburg and WXMI in Grand Rapids – to Standard Media Group (an independent broadcast holding company formed by private equity firm Standard General to assume ownership of and absolve ownership conflicts involving the aforementioned stations) for $441.1 million. The transaction includes a transitional services agreement, through which Sinclair would have continued operating WXLV for six months after the sale's completion.

Three weeks after the FCC's July 18 vote to have the deal reviewed by an administrative law judge amid "serious concerns" about Sinclair's forthrightness in its applications to sell certain conflict properties, on August 9, 2018, Tribune announced it would terminate the Sinclair deal, intending to seek other M&A opportunities. Tribune also filed a breach of contract lawsuit in the Delaware Chancery Court, alleging that Sinclair engaged in protracted negotiations with the FCC and the DOJ over regulatory issues, refused to sell stations in markets where it already had properties, and proposed divestitures to parties with ties to Sinclair executive chair David D. Smith that were rejected or highly subject to rejection to maintain control over stations it was required to sell. The termination of the Sinclair sale agreement also meant that Standard Media's purchases of WXLV and the other six Tribune- and Sinclair-operated stations included in that deal would not proceed, because they were predicated on the closure of the Sinclair–Tribune merger, meaning that WXLV will remain with Sinclair for the foreseeable future.

Newscasts
The station established a news department after becoming an ABC affiliate in 1995. At the operation's height, it aired local newscasts each weeknight at 6 and 11 as well as on weekends under the branding News 45 (which was subsequently changed to ABC 45 News). The station also ran weather cut-ins during Good Morning America on weekday mornings. WXLV's sports department produced a local high school sports program known as Friday Night Football.

The news operation was unable to gain significant traction in the ratings against WFMY-TV (channel 2), WGHP, and WXII-TV (channel 12). WXLV discontinued its weekday morning cut-ins and weekend evening newscasts in 2000. The news operation was shut down entirely on January 11, 2002.

In 2003, Sinclair restarted a local news department for WUPN and WXLV. Sister station WUPN began airing a nightly 10 p.m. newscast. As part of Sinclair's News Central operation, local news segments originated from the Winston-Salem studios while national news, weather, and sports segments were based at the company's headquarters on Beaver Dam Road in Hunt Valley, Maryland. In 2004, an identical 11 p.m. newscast, ABC 45 News Late Edition, premiered on WXLV. It also aired "The Point", a controversial one-minute conservative political commentary feature, that was a requirement of all Sinclair-owned stations with newscasts (regardless of whether it carried the News Central format or not).

Both newscasts were pulled in mid-2005 due to poor ratings; the News Central format would be phased out entirely in its other markets by March 2006. For a time afterward, News Central still provided WXLV with weekday morning weather cut-ins during Good Morning America featuring meteorologist Tony Pagnotti. Production of the cut-ins is now based from its Asheville sister station, WLOS, with meteorologist Julie Wunder providing the taped-in-advance updates.

As part of the settlement of a retransmission consent agreement between Time Warner Cable and Sinclair, local cable news channel News 14 Carolina, which was then owned by the cable provider, began producing newscasts for WXLV under the name News 14 Carolina on ABC 45 on January 2, 2012, with half-hour broadcasts at 6:30 a.m., 6 and 11 p.m.  With Time Warner Cable consolidating all of its local news channels under the Time Warner Cable News name, the newscasts were renamed Time Warner Cable News on ABC 45, and in September 2016 after Charter Communications' purchase of Time Warner Cable, rebranded under the merged entity's branding of Spectrum as Spectrum News on ABC 45. The newscasts are produced at Spectrum News' Triad newsroom in the Centreport office complex in Greensboro, but anchored from their studios in Raleigh (or occasionally, Charlotte). Like programming on the cable channel, the newscasts on WXLV are broadcast in 16:9 widescreen standard definition.

Although Time Warner Cable/Charter-owned regional cable channels have produced news and sports content for broadcast stations in the past (such as a now-expired agreement between Kansas City's KCTV and Metro Sports for the latter to compile and produce the station's sports coverage), the WXLV/Charter agreement is the second instance in which a cable news channel has produced news broadcasts for a television station; in Washington, D.C., News Channel 8 produced a nightly 10 p.m. newscast for then UPN affiliate WDCA in 1995. Spectrum News on ABC 45 was dropped without explanation on September 6, 2019. The 6:30 a.m. newscast was replaced with a repeat of America This Morning. The 6 p.m. newscast was replaced with the third episode of Family Feud. The 11 p.m. newscast was replaced with the news program Daily Mail TV. In December 2020, it was announced that WXLV would bring back their own local news starting January 18, 2021. As of 2021, WXLV presently broadcasts 10 hours of locally produced newscasts each week. The newscasts are anchored out of KABB in San Antonio, Texas.  Unlike most ABC stations, it does not carry a weekend newscast.

Technical information

Subchannels
The station's digital signal is multiplexed:

Analog-to-digital conversion
On February 2, 2009, Sinclair told cable and satellite television providers via e-mail that regardless of the exact mandatory switchover date to digital-only broadcasting for full-power stations (which Congress rescheduled for June 12 days later), the station would shut down its analog signal on the original transition date of February 17, making WXLV and WMYV the first stations in the market to convert to digital-only broadcast transmissions. WXLV-TV shut down its analog signal at 11:59 p.m. on that date. The station's digital signal remained on its pre-transition UHF channel 29, using PSIP to display WXLV-TV's virtual channel as 45 on digital television receivers.

As part of the SAFER Act, WXLV-TV kept its analog signal on the air until March 13 to inform viewers of the digital television transition through a loop of public service announcements from the National Association of Broadcasters.

References

External links

Sinclair Broadcast Group
ABC network affiliates
Charge! (TV network) affiliates
TBD (TV network) affiliates
Stadium (sports network) affiliates
Television channels and stations established in 1979
XLV-TV
1979 establishments in North Carolina